Galina Semenova (1937-2016) was a Soviet-Russian Politician (Communist).

She was a member of the Politburo of the Communist Party of the Soviet Union in 1989-1991. She was one of four women ever to be a part of the Politburo, and one of only three women to be full members of the Politburo.

References

1937 births
20th-century Russian women politicians
20th-century Russian politicians
Russian communists
Soviet women in politics
Politburo of the Central Committee of the Communist Party of the Soviet Union members
2016 deaths